Zhao Lixue (born 7 November 1990) is a Chinese Paralympic archer. He won the silver medal in the men's individual recurve open event at the 2020 Summer Paralympics held in Tokyo, Japan. He also won the bronze medal in the mixed team recurve open event.

References

Living people
1990 births
Chinese male archers
Paralympic archers of China
Paralympic silver medalists for China
Paralympic bronze medalists for China
Paralympic medalists in archery
Archers at the 2016 Summer Paralympics
Archers at the 2020 Summer Paralympics
Medalists at the 2020 Summer Paralympics
Place of birth missing (living people)
21st-century Chinese people